Tornillo can mean:

 Tornillo, Texas
 Tornillo tent city
 Tornillo (album), a 2022 album by Whiskey Myers
 Tornillo, an album by Glen Phillips
 tornillo event, a low-frequency volcanic seismic event
 Any of several species of trees in the genus Prosopis, including:
 Prosopis pubescens
 Prosopis reptans, a species of Mesquite
 Mark Tornillo, lead vocalist for Accept, a German rock band
 Miami Herald Publishing Co. v. Tornillo, a case decided by the U.S. Supreme Court in 1974